G.D.R. Monsanto is a Portuguese football club based in the village of Monsanto in the municipality of Idanha-a-Nova in east Portugal. They currently play in one of eight regional leagues in the Terceira Divisão in the fourth tier of Portuguese football.

History 
G.D.R. Monsanto has existed informally for most of the 20th century, but was formally constituted in 1976 as part of a sports club that also competes in cycling and chess. In recent years, the team played in the Santarém District Leagues before reaching promotion to the Terceira Divisão in 2004 and subsequently the Segunda Divisão in 2008.

The club was relegated to the Third Division for the 2010–11 season, where it won the Série D league, and returned to compete in the Second Division in 2011–12.

Each season, the team competes in the Portuguese Cup.

Stadium 

G.D.R. Monsanto play their home matches in Campo do Pião, Monsanto. The stadium's capacity is 1000.

Current squad 

As of 20 June 2011.

Achievements 

 Terceira Divisão Serie D:
 Winners (2): 2007–08, 2010–11
 Santarém District League First Division (fifth tier league): Winners (1): 2003–04
 Santarém District League Second Division (sixth tier league): Winners (1):''' 2000–01

See also 

 Portuguese football league system
 Football in Portugal

External links 

 Official website 
 Facebook page

References 

Football clubs in Portugal
Association football clubs established in 1976
1976 establishments in Portugal